Danilo Veron Bairros (born 11 March 1987), commonly known as Danilinho, is a Brazilian professional footballer who plays for Central Sport Club.
 
An attacking midfielder, he plays mainly as a winger and central midfielder. He is known for his technical skill, quick acceleration and dribbling. Before joining Tigres, he played for América, Santos FC, Atlético Mineiro and Chiapas.

Career

Loan to Chiapas
On 16 December 2015, Querétaro announced via Twitter that Danilinho would be joining Chiapas on loan for the next 6 months with an option to sign permanently.

Loan to Fluminense
On 15 July 2016, Danilinho joined Fluminense on a one-year loan deal.

Honours

Club
Atlético Mineiro
 Campeonato Brasileiro Série B: 2006
 Campeonato Mineiro: 2007, 2012

UANL
 Primera División de México: Apertura 2011
 Copa MX: Clausura 2014

References

External links
 
 

1987 births
Living people
Sportspeople from Mato Grosso do Sul
Brazilian footballers
Association football midfielders
Brazil under-20 international footballers
Brazil youth international footballers
FC Schalke 04 players
Campeonato Brasileiro Série A players
Campeonato Brasileiro Série B players
América Futebol Clube (SP) players
Mirassol Futebol Clube players
Santos FC players
Clube Atlético Mineiro players
Fluminense FC players
Liga MX players
Chiapas F.C. footballers
Tigres UANL footballers
Querétaro F.C. footballers
Esporte Clube Vitória players
Correcaminos UAT footballers
Clube de Regatas Brasil players
Central Sport Club players
Brazilian expatriate footballers
Brazilian expatriate sportspeople in Germany
Expatriate footballers in Germany
Brazilian expatriate sportspeople in Mexico
Expatriate footballers in Mexico